Horror for Good: A Charitable Anthology (Volume 1) is a non-themed anthology of thirty-two horror short stories, featuring some of the biggest names in the horror fiction genre, including Joe R. Lansdale, Ramsey Campbell, Jack Ketchum, F. Paul Wilson, Ray Garton and Joe McKinney.

It was published by Cutting Block Press in 2012 and 100 percent of the proceeds will go to amfAR, The Foundation for AIDS Research.

The anthology was co-edited by Mark Scioneaux, Robert S. Wilson and R. J. Cavender.

Scioneaux, Horror for Good founder, writes in his original introduction that "The heart of the horror community is on full display, and it stretches from the very top with Horror Writers Association President Rocky Wood, all the way to an author whose first ever published work will appear in these pages. The Horror Community has heart!"

Scioneaux adds, "The authors contained within these pages are a mix of some of the brightest stars and some of the most promising new talent in horror. They have donated their stories, consisting of rare reprints, personal favorites, and brand new, never-before-published tales."

The anthology premiered at the World Horror Convention in Salt Lake City, Utah in March 2012.

Table of contents

 A Message from the HWA President ~ Rocky Wood
 The Journey of Horror for Good ~ Mark C. Scioneaux
 Autumn as Metaphor ~ G. N. Braun
 On a Dark October ~ Joe R. Lansdale
 Mouth ~ Nate Southard
 Blood for the American People ~ Lisa Morton
 Reception ~ Ray Garton
 The Long Hunt ~ Ian Harding
 The Apocalypse Ain't So Bad ~ Jeff Strand
 The Gift ~ Monica O’Rourke
 The Silent Ones ~ Taylor Grant
 Sky of Brass, Land of Iron ~ Joe McKinney
 Consanguinity ~ Lorne Dixon
 Dead Letters ~ Ramsey Campbell
 The Monster in the Drawer ~ Wrath James White
 Baptism ~ Tracie McBride
 Atlantis Purging ~ Boyd E. Harris
 Returns ~ Jack Ketchum
 The Other Patrick ~ Brad C. Hodson
 A Question of Morality ~ Shaun Hutson
 The Meat Man ~ Jonathan Templar
 A Man in Shape Alone ~ Lee Thomas
 Solution ~ Benjamin Kane Ethridge
 To and Fro ~ Richard Salter
 Please Don't Hurt Me ~ F. Paul Wilson
 The Depravity of Inanimate Things ~ John F. D. Taff
 The Lift ~ G.R. Yeates
 The Eyes Have It ~ Rena Mason
 Road Flowers ~ Gary McMahon
 The Widows Laveau ~ Steven W. Booth & Norman L. Rubenstein
 This Thing That Clawed Itself Inside Me ~ John Mantooth
 Somewhere on Sebastian Street ~ Stephen Bacon
 June Decay ~ Danica Green
 Shiva, Open Your Eye ~ Laird Barron

See also

 Lists of books

References 

2012 anthologies
American anthologies
Horror anthologies
Art for charity